Bridezilla is a 2019 Indonesian comedy-drama film directed by Andibachtiar Yusuf, from a screenplay by Lucky Kuswandi and Fai Tirtha. It stars Jessica Mila, Rio Dewanto, Sheila Dara, and Rafael Tan. The film was released on August 1, 2019.

Synopsis 
Dara had a childhood dream to have an ideal wedding party. Her dream came true when she became a "wedding organizer". However, a small mistake at the wedding of a lesser-known celebrity made Dara's organizer fall and threatened to go bankrupt. The conflict gets bigger when Dara and Alvin's long-dreamed marriage gets closer.

Cast 

 Jessica Mila as Dara
 Rio Dewanto as Alvin
 Sheila Dara as Key
 Rafael Tan as A'ang
 Widyawati as Anna Soedarjo
 Aimee Saras as Kirana
 Rukman Rosadi as Dara's father
 Lucinta Luna as Queen Lucinta
 Adriano Qalbi as Lord Bobby
 Melissa Karim as Yoga Teacher

References

External links 
 
 
 

2019 films
Films about weddings
2019 comedy-drama films
2010s Indonesian-language films
Indonesian comedy-drama films
Films shot in Indonesia
Films set in Indonesia